Vivek Bhargava is an Indian businessman and business executive who served as the CEO of iProspect and DAN Performance Group. He was the founder of Communicate 2, a media company, which Dentsu Aegis Network later acquired in 2012. He is currently serving as the co-founder of ProfitWheel, a SaaS company. He is also one of the main investors on the ET Now reality television series The Vault. He serves as the Chairman of the IAMAI Startup Committee.

Career 
Vivek Bhargava founded a digital advertising agency, Communicate 2, in 1997. It started its operations as a web development company and later diversified its services. In 2012, he sold Communicate 2 to iProspect from the Dentsu Aegis Network (DAN), where Bhargava led iProspect Communicate 2 as the founder and managing director of the company. It was rebranded to iProspect India in 2015 and Vivek was appointed as the CEO of iProspect India.

In December 2016, he was promoted to CEO of DAN Performance Group, looking after all of Dentsu's digital performance agencies. Dentsu Performance Group included iProspect, Merkle Sokrati, SVG Media and DAN Consult. He quit Dentsu to start ProfitWheel, a SaaS company that he co-founded in 2020. In October 2021, Bhargava raised seed funding for ProfitWheel from Netcore Cloud and angel investors.

As a speaker, he has spoken at various events and conferences such as Ad:tech, TED, SES, SMX and I-com. He has delivered guest lectures at many institutes, including IIT Bombay, IIM Ahmedabad and Harvard. He is co-chair of SEMPO (Search Engine Marketing Professional Organization)'s India chapter. He also serves as the Chairman of the IAMAI Startup Committee, a mentoring programme by the Internet and Mobile Association of India.

Awards and recognition 
 2016: DMAI Knight of the Year at the DMAI Awards
 2016: Marketing Professional of the Year at the Indo Lanka Customer Engagement Forum
 2015: Marketer of the Year award at the 5th Asian Customer Engagement Forum

See also 
 Dentsu International

References

External links 
 Birthday bumps: iProspect India’s Vivek Bhargava at The Economic Times
 DAN Performance Group's Vivek Bhargava (Interview published in The Economic Times)
 How iProspect's Vivek Bhargava foresaw a digital future two decades ago at IndianTelevision
 Vivek Bhargava's Interview at The Financial Express

Indian chief executives
Living people
Indian advertising executives
Year of birth missing (living people)